The California Pacific Conference (Cal Pac) is a college athletic conference affiliated with the National Association of Intercollegiate Athletics (NAIA). The conference commissioner is Don Ott. Conference leadership is shared among the member institutions. The secretary is Marv Christopher of California Maritime Academy. The conference was formed in 1996.

Conference members range from members of the University of California and California State University systems to religious and liberal arts colleges

History

California State University at East Bay, California State University at Monterey Bay, Dominican University, Mills College, and Notre Dame de Namur University are former members of the conference that have left the Cal Pac and the NAIA for the Division II and Division III ranks of the National Collegiate Athletic Association (NCAA).

 Cal State–Monterey Bay and Cal State–East Bay left the Cal Pac to join the NCAA Division II California Collegiate Athletic Association (CCAA) in the 2004–05 and 2008–09 seasons, respectively.
 Patten University left the Cal Pac when the school chose to discontinue its athletic program after the 2004–05 season.
 Notre Dame de Namur left the Cal Pac to join the NCAA Division II Pacific West Conference in the 2006–07 season, followed by Dominican in the 2008–09 season.
 Mills moved to NCAA Division III as an Independent in the 2011–12 season.

In June 2011, Bethany University announced it was ceasing operations effective immediately, decreasing the Cal Pac to seven active members.

In 2012, Holy Names University left the Cal Pac to join the Pacific West Conference; while Embry–Riddle Aeronautical University at Prescott, Marymount California University, and Soka University of America joined to increase the conference membership to nine schools.

La Sierra University joined in 2013 to bring the conference up to 10 members. William Jessup University left in 2014, leaving the conference with nine members. Membership rose to twelve schools in 2015 when the University of Antelope Valley, Benedictine University at Mesa, Providence Christian College, and Sierra Nevada University joined; while Menlo College left for the Golden State Athletic Conference.

The University of Saint Katherine joined in 2019. In March 2020, the conference announced two additions for the 2020–21 academic year when Park University at Gilbert and Westcliff University were admitted to the NAIA.

Sierra Nevada approved in July 2021 an agreement to merge with NCAA Division I's University of Nevada, Reno (Nevada). The merger was given accreditation approval in late December and scheduled for completion before 2022–23, leading to Sierra Nevada's departure from Cal Pac.

Chronological timeline
 1995 - The California Pacific Conference (Cal Pac) was founded. Charter members included Bethany College (later Bethany University), California Maritime Academy (now California State University Maritime Academy), California State University at Monterey Bay, Dominican College (now the Dominican University of California), Holy Names College (now Holy Names University), Menlo College, Pacific Union College, Patten College (now Patten University), and Simpson College (now Simpson University) beginning the 1996-97 academic year.
 1998 - California State University at Hayward (now California State University at East Bay) and the College of Notre Dame (later Notre Dame de Namur University) joined the Cal Pac in the 1998-99 academic year.
 1999 - Mills College joined the Cal Pac in the 1999-2000 academic year.
 2004 - Cal State–Monterey Bay left the Cal Pac to join the Division II ranks of the National Collegiate Athletic Association (NCAA) and the California Collegiate Athletic Association (CCAA) after the 2003-04 academic year.
 2004 - Jessup University, then known as William Jessup University, joined the Cal Pac in the 2004-05 academic year.
 2005 - Patten left the Cal Pac to become an NAIA Independent after the 2004-05 academic year.
 2006 - Notre Dame de Namur left the Cal Pac to join the NCAA Division II ranks and the Pacific West Conference (PacWest) after the 2005-06 academic year.
 2009 - Two institutions left the Cal Pac and the NAIA to join the NCAA Division II ranks and to their respective new home primary conferences: Cal State–East Bay to the CCAA, and Dominican (Cal.) to the PacWest after the 2008-09 academic year.
 2011 - The University of California at Merced joined the Cal Pac in the 2011-12 academic year.
 2012 - Holy Names left the Cal Pac and the NAIA to join the NCAA Division II ranks and the PacWest after the 2011-12 academic year.
 2012 - Embry–Riddle Aeronautical University–Prescott, Marymount California University, and Soka University of America joined the Cal Pac in the 2012-13 academic year.
 2013 - La Sierra University joined the Cal Pac in the 2013-14 academic year.
 2014 - William Jessup left the Cal Pac to join the Golden State Athletic Conference after the 2013-14 academic year.
 2015 - Menlo left the Cal Pac to join the GSAC after the 2014-15 academic year.
 2015 - The University of Antelope Valley, Benedictine University at Mesa, Providence Christian College, and Sierra Nevada College (now Sierra Nevada University) joined the Cal Pac in the 2015-16 academic year.
 2019 - The University of Saint Katherine joined the Cal Pac in the 2019-20 academic year.
 2020 - Park University Gilbert and Westcliff University joined the Cal Pac in the 2020-21 academic year.
 2021 - Sierra Nevada left the Cal Pac after the 2021-22 academic year as the school announced plans to merge with the University of Nevada, Renoly dropping all athletic programs in the process.
 2022 - Marymount California left the Cal Pac after the 2021-22 academic year as the school announced its closure in August of that year.
 2023 - Benedictine at Mesa, Embry-Riddle Prescott, Park–Gilbert, and St. Katherine all announced their departure for the Golden State Athletic Conference for the 2024-25 athletic season.

Member schools

Current members
The Cal Pac currently has 13 full members, all but two are private schools:

Notes

Former members
The Cal Pac had 12 former full members, all but two were private schools:

Notes

Membership timeline

Sports sponsored

See also
 Big West Conference, a conference that competes in Division I that consisted entirely of California schools from 2005 to 2012
 California Collegiate Athletic Association, an all-California school conference that competes in Division II
 Golden State Athletic Conference, an NAIA conference that consisted entirely of California schools from its formation in 1986 until 2012.

References

External links

 
College sports in California
1996 establishments in California
Organizations based in Oakland, California
Sports in the San Francisco Bay Area